In mathematics, an algebraic stack is a vast generalization of algebraic spaces, or schemes, which are foundational for studying moduli theory. Many moduli spaces are constructed using techniques specific to algebraic stacks, such as Artin's representability theorem, which is used to construct the moduli space of pointed algebraic curves  and the moduli stack of elliptic curves. Originally, they were introduced by Grothendieck to keep track of automorphisms on moduli spaces, a technique which allows for treating these moduli spaces as if their underlying schemes or algebraic spaces are smooth. But, through many generalizations the notion of algebraic stacks was finally discovered by Michael Artin.

Definition

Motivation 
One of the motivating examples of an algebraic stack is to consider a groupoid scheme  over a fixed scheme . For example, if  (where  is the group scheme of roots of unity),  is the projection map,  is the group actionand  is the multiplication mapon . Then, given an -scheme , the groupoid scheme  forms a groupoid (where  are their associated functors). Moreover, this construction is functorial on  forming a contravariant 2-functorwhere  is the 2-category of small categories. Another way to view this is as a fibred category  through the Grothendieck construction. For instance, in the associated groupoid of -points for a field , over the origin object  there is the groupoid of automorphisms .

Algebraic stacks 
Then, an algebraic stack is a fibered categorysuch that

 The diagonal map  of fibered categories is representable as algebraic spaces
 There exists an  scheme  and an associated 1-morphism of fibered categories  which is surjective and smooth called an atlas.

Explanation of technical conditions

Using the fppf topology 
First of all, the fppf-topology is used because it behaves well with respect to descent. For a cover  we say a property  is local on the source if has  if and only if each  has .There is an analogous notion on the target called local on the target. This means given a cover  has  if and only if each  has .For the fppf topology, having an immersion is local on the target. In addition to the previous properties local on the source for the fppf topology,  being universally open is also local on the source. Also, being locally Noetherian and Jacobson are local on the source and target for the fppf topology. This does not hold in the fpqc topology, making it not as "nice" in terms of technical properties. Even though this is true, using algebraic stacks over the fpqc topology still has its use, such as in chromatic homotopy theory. This is because the Moduli stack of formal group laws  is an fpqc-algebraic stackpg 40.

Representable diagonal 
There are a number of equivalent conditions for representability of the diagonal which help give intuition for this technical condition, but one of main motivations is the following: for a scheme  and objects  the sheaf  is representable as an algebraic space. In particular, the stabilizer group for any point on the stack  is representable as an algebraic space.

Another important equivalence of having a representable diagonal is the technical condition that the intersection of any two algebraic spaces in an algebraic stack is an algebraic space. Reformulated using fiber productsthe representability of the diagonal is equivalent to  being representable for an algebraic space . This is because given morphisms  from algebraic spaces, they extend to maps  from the diagonal map.

Note that an analogous condition of representability of the diagonal holds for some formulations of higher stacks where the fiber product is an -stack for an -stack .

Surjective and smooth atlas

2-Yoneda lemma 
The existence of an  scheme  and a 1-morphism of fibered categories  which is surjective and smooth depends on defining a smooth and surjective morphisms of fibered categories. Here  is the algebraic stack from the representable functor  on  upgraded to a category fibered in groupoids where the categories only have trivial morphisms. Henceis a 2-functor of groupoids. Showing this 2-functor is a sheaf is the content of the 2-Yoneda lemma. Using the Grothendieck construction, there is an associated category fibered in groupoids denoted .

Representable morphisms of categories fibered in groupoids 
To say this morphism  is smooth or surjective, we have to introduce representable morphisms. Then, we can say the morphism of categories fibered in groupoids  is smooth and surjective if the associated morphismof schemes is smooth and surjective.

Deligne-Mumford stacks 
Algebraic stacks, also known as Artin stacks, are by definition equipped with a smooth surjective atlas , where  is the stack associated to some scheme . If the atlas  is moreover étale, then  is said to be a Deligne-Mumford stack. The subclass of Deligne-Mumford stacks is useful because it provides the correct setting for many natural stacks considered, such as the moduli stack of algebraic curves. In addition, they are strict enough that object represented by points in Deligne-Mumford stacks do not have infinitesimal automorphisms. This is very important because infinitesimal automorphisms make studying the deformation theory of Artin stacks very difficult. For example, the deformation theory of the Artin stack , the moduli stack of rank  vector bundles, has infinitesimal automorphisms controlled partially by the Lie algebra . This leads to an infinite sequence of deformations and obstructions in general, which is one of the motivations for studying moduli of stable bundles. Only in the special case of the deformation theory of line bundles  is the deformation theory tractable, since the associated Lie algebra is abelian.

Note that many stacks cannot be naturally represented as Deligne-Mumford stacks because it only allows for finite covers, or, algebraic stacks with finite covers. Note that because every Etale cover is flat and locally of finite presentation, algebraic stacks defined with the fppf-topology subsume this theory; but, it is still useful since many stacks found in nature are of this form, such as the moduli of curves . Also, the differential-geometric analogue of such stacks are called orbifolds. The Etale condition implies the 2-functorsending a scheme to its groupoid of -torsors is representable as a stack over the Etale topology, but the Picard-stack  of -torsors (equivalently the category of line bundles) is not representable. Stacks of this form are representable as stacks over the fppf-topology.

Another reason for considering the fppf-topology versus the etale topology is over characteristic  the Kummer sequenceis exact only as a sequence of fppf sheaves, but not as a sequence of etale sheaves.

Defining algebraic stacks over other topologies 
Using other Grothendieck topologies on  gives alternative theories of algebraic stacks which are either not general enough, or don't behave well with respect to exchanging properties from the base of a cover to the total space of a cover.

Structure sheaf 
The structure sheaf of an algebraic stack is an object pulled back from a universal structure sheaf  on the site . This universal structure sheaf is defined asand the associated structure sheaf on a category fibered in groupoidsis defined aswhere  comes from the map of Grothendieck topologies. As a sanity check, it's worth comparing this to a category fibered in groupoids coming from an -scheme  for various topologies.

Examples

Classifying stacks 

Many classifying stacks for algebraic groups are algebraic stacks. In fact, for an algebraic group space  over a scheme  which is flat of finite presentation, the stack  is algebraictheorem 6.1.

See also 

 Gerbe
 Chow group of a stack
 Cohomology of a stack
 Quotient stack
 Sheaf on an algebraic stack
 Toric stack
 Artin's criterion
 Pursuing Stacks
 Derived algebraic geometry

References

External links

Artin's Axioms 
 https://stacks.math.columbia.edu/tag/07SZ - Look at "Axioms" and "Algebraic stacks"
 Artin Algebraization and Quotient Stacks - Jarod Alper

Papers

Applications

Mathoverflow threads 

 Do algebraic stacks satisfy fpqc descent?
 Stacks in the fpqc topology
 fpqc covers of stacks

Other 

 Examples of Stacks
 Notes on Grothendieck topologies, fibered categories and descent theory
 Notes on algebraic stacks

Algebraic curves
Moduli theory
Algebraic geometry